Discourse ethics refers to a type of argument that attempts to establish normative or ethical truths by examining the presuppositions of discourse. The ethical theory originated with German philosophers Jürgen Habermas and Karl-Otto Apel, and variations have been used by Frank Van Dun and Habermas' student Hans-Hermann Hoppe.

Habermas and Apel
Habermas's discourse ethics is his attempt to explain the implications of communicative rationality in the sphere of moral insight and normative validity. It is a complex theoretical effort to reformulate the fundamental insights of Kantian deontological ethics in terms of the analysis of communicative structures.  This means that it is an attempt to explain the universal and obligatory nature of morality by evoking the universal obligations of communicative rationality. It is also a cognitivist moral theory, which means it holds that justifying the validity of moral norms can be done in a manner analogous to the justification of facts.  However, the entire project is undertaken as a rational reconstruction of moral insight.  It claims only to reconstruct the implicit normative orientations that guide individuals and it claims to access these through an analysis of communication.

Public discourse ethics
This type of ethics consists of conversations about ideas in civic or community contexts marked by diversity of perspectives requiring thoughtful public engagement. This discourse is made up of differing insights that helps to shape the public's engagement with one another. This type of discourse is meant to protect and to promote the public good. For public discourse ethics to be successful there must be an effective level of civility between people or persons involved. It was Sigmund Freud who once said, "civilization began the first time an angry person cast a word instead of a rock" and that statement is something that continues to be seen in society today. The Harvard Law Review accurately examines public discourse and explains it in a manner that is appropriate and conceptually accurate. "Every man who publishes a book commits himself to the judgement of the public, and anyone may comment upon his performance.... [W]hatever their merits, others have a right to pass their judgement upon them-to censure them if they be censurable, and to turn them into ridicule if they be ridiculous". For the public discourse ethics to be productive there must be accountability on the public stage as the Harvard Law Review calls into question. Without any act of accountability the ethicality of the discourse is no longer valid and cannot go on. Public accountability consists of three basic factors. The factors are:
 a diversity of ideas, 
 an engagement  of public decision making, and finally 
 an account for continuing a practice or way of doing something or a means or reason for changing the practice. 
Finally, public discourse ethics puts a great responsibility on the individual. They must continually be asking questions and finding answers. They will not always be right, and that is okay, as long as they are able to make a positive decision in the end.

Presupposition
Habermas maintains that normative validity cannot be understood as separate from the argumentative procedures used in everyday practice, such as those used to resolve issues concerning the legitimacy of actions and the validity of the norms governing interactions. He makes this claim by making reference to the validity dimensions attached to speech acts in communication and the implicit forms of argumentation they imply (see Universal pragmatics). The basic idea is that the validity of a moral norm cannot be justified in the mind of an isolated individual reflecting on the world. The validity of a norm is justified only intersubjectively in processes of argumentation between individuals; in a dialectic. The validity of a claim to normative rightness depends upon the mutual understanding achieved by individuals in argument.

From this it follows that the presuppositions of argumentation would become important. Kant extracted moral principles from the necessities forced upon a rational subject reflecting on the world. Habermas extracts moral principles from the necessities forced upon individuals engaged in the discursive justification of validity claims, from the inescapable presuppositions of communication and argumentation. These presuppositions were the kinds of idealization that individuals had to make in order for communication and argumentation to even begin. For example:
 The presupposition that participants in communicative exchange are using the same linguistic expressions in the same way
 The presupposition that no relevant argument is suppressed or excluded by the participants
 The presupposition that no force except that of the better argument is exerted
 The presupposition that all the participants are motivated only by a concern for the better argument

There were also presuppositions unique to discourse:
 The presupposition that everyone would agree to the universal validity of the claim thematized
 The presupposition that everyone capable of speech and action is entitled to participate, and everyone is equally entitled to introduce new topics or express attitudes needs or desires
 The presupposition that no validity claim is exempt in principle from critical evaluation in argumentation

These are all at the center of Habermas's moral theory. Habermas's discourse ethics attempts to distill the idealized moral point of view that accompanies a perfectly rational process of argumentation (also idealized), which would be the moral principle implied by the presuppositions listed above.  The key point is that the presuppositions of argumentation and communication that have been rationally reconstructed by Habermas are both factual and normative.  This can be said about his entire project because it is explicitly attempting to bridge the gap between the "is" and the "ought."  Habermas speaks of the mutual recognition and exchanging of roles and perspectives that are demanded by the very structural condition of rational argumentation. He maintains that what is implied in these factual presuppositions of communication is the deep structure of moral norms, the conditions that every valid norm must fulfill.

Universalization
The presuppositions of communication express a universal obligation to maintain impartial judgment in discourse, which constrains all affected to adopt the perspectives of all others in the exchange of reasons.  From this Habermas extracts the following principle of universalization (U), which is the condition every valid norm has to fulfill:

(U) All affected can accept the consequences and the side effects that [the norm's] general observance can be anticipated to have for the satisfaction of everyone's interests, and the consequences are preferred to those of known alternative possibilities for regulation. (Habermas, 1991:65)

This can be understood as the deep structure of all acceptable moral norms, and should not be confused with the principle of discourse ethics (D), which presupposes that norms exist that satisfy the conditions specified by (U).

(D) Only those norms can claim to be valid that meet (or could meet) with the approval of all affected in their capacity as participants in a practical discourse.

The implications of (U) and (D) are quite profound. (U) claims to be a rational reconstruction of the impartial moral point of view at the heart of all cognitivist moral theories. According to moral cognitivists (e.g. Kant, Rawls etc.), it is only from such a moral point of view that insight into the actual (quasi-factual) impersonal obligations of a general will can be gained, because this perspective relieves decisions from the inaccuracies of personal interests.  Of course, Habermas's reconstruction is different because it is intersubjective.  That is, Habermas (unlike Kant or Rawls) formulates the moral point of view as it arises out of the multiple perspectives of those affected by a norm under consideration.  The moral point of view explicated in (U) is not the property of an individual subject but the property of a community of interlocutors, the results of a complex dialogical process of role taking and perspective exchanging.  Furthermore, (U) is deduced from a rational reconstruction of the presupposition of communication, which downgrades the strong transcendentalism of Kantian ethics by establishing a foundation in inner-worldly processes of communication.

(D) on the other hand is a principle concerning the manner in which norms conforming to (U) must be justified through discourse.  Again, Habermas takes the task of moral reflection out of the isolated individual's head and gives it to intersubjective processes of communication.  What (D) proposes is that moral principles must be validated in actual discourse and that those to be affected by a norm must be able to participate in argumentation concerning its validity.  No number of thought experiments can replace a communicative exchange with others regarding moral norms that will affect them.  Moreover, this general prescription concerning the type of discourse necessary for the justification of moral norms opens the process of moral deliberation to the kind of learning that accompanies a fallibilistic orientation.  (U) and (D) are catalysts for a moral learning process, which although fallible is not relative.  The flesh and blood insights of participants in communicative exchange are refracted through the universal guidelines explicated from the deep structures of communication and argumentation.  This spawns discourses with a rational trajectory, which are grounded in the particular circumstances of those involved but aimed at a universal moral validity.

Practical applications

The practical applications of discourse ethics have taken a significant turn after the publication of Habermas' book Between Facts and Norms (1992), where its application to democracy and the legislative process was substantially refined and expanded. Before this book, Habermas had left open the question of the various applications of discourse theory to almost any type of consensus oriented group ranging from highly visible political and governmental groups, such as Parliament in Great Britain and Congressional debate in the United States, and other consensus oriented activities as found in public and private institutions such as those supported on various international websites and Wikipedia.

See also
 Argumentation theory
 Foucault–Habermas debate

References

Further reading
 
 
 
 Calhoun, C. 1992 ed., Habermas and the Public Sphere (Cambridge, Massachusetts: MIT Press).
 
 
 Cohen, J.L., 1995, “Critical Social Theory and Feminist Critiques: The Debate with Jürgen Habermas,” in Johanna Meehan, ed., Feminists Read Habermas: Gendering the Subject of Discourse (New York: Routledge), pp. 57–90.
 Eley, G., 1992, “Nations, Publics, and Political Cultures: Placing Habermas in the Nineteenth Century,” in Craig Calhoun, ed., Habermas and the Public Sphere (Cambridge, Massachusetts: MIT Press), pp. 289–339.
 Foucault, M., 1988, “The Ethic of Care for the Self as a Practice of Freedom,” in James Bernauer and David Rasmussen, eds., The Final Foucault (Cambridge, Massachusetts: MIT Press), pp. 1–20.
 Fraser, N., 1987, “What’s Critical About Critical Theory? The Case of Habermas and Gender,” in Seyla Benhabib and Drucilla Cornell, eds., Feminism as Critique: On the Politics of Gender (Cambridge: Polity Press), pp. 31–56.
 
 
 Stephan Kinsella, Argumentation Ethics and Liberty: A Concise Guide
 
 Ryan, M.P., 1992, “Gender and Public Access: Women’s Politics in Nineteenth-Century America,” in Craig Calhoun, ed., Habermas and the Public Sphere (Cambridge, Massachusetts: MIT Press), pp. 259–288.
 
 
 
 
 

Ethics
Legal reasoning
Philosophy of language
Pragmatics
Jürgen Habermas